Brasstown is an extinct Cherokee village in Towns County, in the U.S. state of Georgia. The exact location of Brasstown is unknown to the GNIS.

The name "Brasstown" is the result of a mistranslation of its native Cherokee-language name Itse' yi, which correctly translates to "town of the green valley".

References

Geography of Towns County, Georgia
Ghost towns in Georgia (U.S. state)
Cherokee towns